Imer Tureh Molla (also Romanized as Īmer Tūreh Mollā; also known as Īmer Tūr Mollā) is a village in Bagheli-ye Marama Rural District, in the Central District of Gonbad-e Qabus County, Golestan Province, Iran. At the 2006 census, its population was 771, in 173 families.

References 

Populated places in Gonbad-e Kavus County